William John Duffy (7 April 1865 – 1 January 1945) was an Irish nationalist politician from County Galway. He was one of the few people to have served both in the United Kingdom House of Commons and in Dáil Éireann.

His parents were Laurence Duffy from Lisduff, County Galway (1827–1872) and Mary Higgins of Athenry, County Galway (1827–1899).

Duffy was elected at the 1900 general election as Member of Parliament (MP) for South Galway, as an Irish Parliamentary Party candidate, and held the seat until his defeat at the 1918 general election by the Sinn Féin candidate Frank Fahy.

At the June 1927 Irish general election, he was elected as National League Party Teachta Dála (TD) for Galway. He did not contest the September 1927 Irish general election.

References

External links

 

1865 births
1945 deaths
National League Party TDs
Irish Parliamentary Party MPs
Members of the 5th Dáil
Politicians from County Galway
Members of the Parliament of the United Kingdom for County Galway constituencies (1801–1922)
UK MPs 1900–1906
UK MPs 1906–1910
UK MPs 1910
UK MPs 1910–1918